= Class representative =

Class representative may refer to:

- in law, a lead plaintiff
- in mathematics, A set of class representatives is a subset of X which contains exactly one element from each equivalence class
- In Japan and Italy, the equivalent of a class president
